K2-72c is a small exoplanet orbiting around the red dwarf star K2-72 approximately 227.7 light-years away. It is located in the inner edge of the habitable zone. K2-72c completes an orbit in 15.2 days, and it has a radius of only 86% of that of the Earth.

References

Exoplanets discovered in 2016
Transiting exoplanets
72

Aquarius (constellation)
Exoplanets in the habitable zone